Mark D. Levine (born April 30, 1969) is an American politician and educator serving as the 28th Borough President of Manhattan since 2022. Previously, he served as member of the New York City Council from 2014 to 2021, where he represented the 7th district covering Manhattan neighborhoods of Morningside Heights, West Harlem, Washington Heights, and part of the Upper West Side.

Early life and education
Born in Chicago, Illinois, Levine grew up in Columbia, Maryland. His early life was greatly influenced by the social activism of his parents, Marshal and Adele Levine. His cousin on his father's side, Asher Arian, was a prominent political scientist in Israel. Levine majored in physics  at Haverford College and the University of Seville, Spain. He received a Masters in Public Policy from the John F. Kennedy School of Government at Harvard University in 1995. Levine speaks fluent Spanish and Hebrew.

Career
Levine taught bilingual math and science at Junior High School 149 in the South Bronx from 1991 to 1993.  He was a Teach For America corps member in the program’s early years.

In 1994 he founded Neighborhood Trust Federal Credit Union, a cooperatively-owned financial institution serving low-income families in the Washington Heights section of Northern Manhattan. Levine ran for the New York City Council in 2001, finishing second in a ten-way Democratic field.

In 2007 Levine was elected Democratic District Leader in the 71st Assembly District, Part A, representing parts of Hamilton Heights/West Harlem and Washington Heights. He was an early supporter of Barack Obama in the 2008 presidential primary, and ran on Obama’s delegate slate that year in New York’s 15th Congressional District. In 2009 Levine founded the Barack Obama Democratic Club of Upper Manhattan, a progressive, reform-oriented local political club. In 2010 he ran for New York State Senate in the 31st District, finishing second in a four-way race with 39% of the vote.

New York City Council
Levine took office in January, 2014.  During his first term he served as chair of the City Council's Parks Committee, chair of the Council's Jewish Caucus, and founder and co-chair of the Council's Affordable Housing Preservation Taskforce.

Levine was lead sponsor of legislation passed in 2017 which established a right to counsel for low-income tenants facing eviction in housing court, making New York City the first place in the nation to grant such a right.

Other issues Levine has focused on include: construction of affordable housing, greater equity for parks in low-income neighborhoods, improved police-community relations, safer streets and expanded mass transit, dual-language education, historic preservation, expanded access to medical marijuana, and acceptance of bitcoin for payment of NYC fines and fees.

In addition to chairing the health committee, Levine was a member of the education, transportation, economic development, juvenile justice, and hospitals committees at the end of his term.  He was also member of the Progressive Caucus and the Jewish Caucus.

In 2017, Levine won the Democratic primary to remain in his council seat with 75% of the vote over closest competitor Thomas Lopez-Pierre with 25%.

Levine was a candidate for City Council Speaker in 2017.

In his role as chair of the City Council's health committee, Levine gained wide attention during the 2020 coronavirus pandemic.

Manhattan Borough President
Levine announced his candidacy for Manhattan borough president in January 2020. Levine was endorsed by Representatives Adriano Espaillat and Nydia Velázquez, among other elected officials, labor unions, and advocacy groups. He won the Democratic primary defeating New York State Senator Brad Hoylman by 7%, and defeated Republican Lou Puliafito in the November 2021 general election.

Levine took office on January 1, 2022.

Election history

2010

2013

2017

2021

References

External links
 Mark Levine’s official website

|-

1969 births
21st-century American politicians
21st-century American Jews
Educators from New York City
Harvard Kennedy School alumni
Jewish American people in New York (state) politics
Living people
New York (state) Democrats
New York City Council members
New York City Department of Parks and Recreation
Haverford College alumni
Teach For America alumni